The Survivors is a 1983 American comedy film directed by Michael Ritchie. It stars Walter Matthau and Robin Williams, with supporting roles by Jerry Reed, Kristen Vigard, and James Wainwright.

Plot
The story focuses on two beleaguered New Yorkers: Donald Quinelle (Williams), a simple office worker who is fired from his job, and Sonny Paluso (Matthau), a gas station owner whose station is accidentally blown up by Donald. The two men meet in a restaurant which is promptly robbed by a man in a ski mask (Jerry Reed). Donald is shot, but Sonny gets a good look at the man. Donald is interviewed on the news, and inadvertently reveals Sonny's identity. That night the robber (named Jack Locke) visits Sonny's house in order to kill him and his teenage daughter Candice(Vigard), but Donald saves them. Sonny and Donald take Jack to the police at gunpoint.

Donald has become paranoid and convinced of the imminent collapse of society. He buys several guns, leaves his girlfriend, and goes to a Vermont "survival camp" led by a man named Wes. Jack is released from jail. Sonny tries to reason with him, and Jack agrees to leave Donald and Sonny alone if they say nothing to the police. Sonny and Candice go up to the camp to tell Donald of the deal. Donald, however, is so confident of his ability to face danger that he taunts Jack into coming up to the camp for a final showdown.

Donald has become a killing machine thanks to Wes' teachings. He and Jack do battle, and end in a draw. The whole group winds up in the same cabin, which the other campers surround in an attempt to kill Jack.  Sonny, Candice, Jack and Donald escape in Sonny's car. The bloodthirsty campers give chase, but give up once Sonny exposes Wes as a rich businessman whose camp is a fraud. The foursome head home. Donald gets out of the car and has a breakdown, realizing how much he has lost. Sonny tries to comfort him. The two walk back to the car as friends.

Cast
 Walter Matthau as Sonny Paluso
 Robin Williams as Donald Quinelle
 Jerry Reed as Jack Locke
 Kristen Vigard as Candace Paluso
 James Wainwright as Wes Huntley
 Skipp Lynch as Wiley
 Annie McEnroe as Doreen
 John Goodman as Commando
 Marian Hailey as Mrs. Locke
 Joseph Carberry as Detective Matt Burke
 Meg Mundy as Mace Lover
 Marilyn Cooper as Waitress

Reception
The film did not garner many positive reviews, scoring only a 9% fresh rating on Rotten Tomatoes, based on 11 reviews. Many felt that Robin Williams and Walter Matthau's style of humor did not mesh well together. An exception to the negative critical tide was the review that Pauline Kael gave the film in The New Yorker: 
The banner line on the ad says ' Once they declare war on each other, watch out. You could die laughing.' The Survivors isn't about two men declaring war on each other; it's about two New Yorkers without anything in common who become friends. The advertisers probably didn't know what to do with it because it's a comedy for grownups. There's a lot of unconventional humour in the writing by Michael Leeson. Robin Williams' work transcends the film's flaws. He acts with an emotional purity that I can't pretend to understand. A lot of the comedy comes from his being a grownup with this ranting little kid inside him. Walter Matthau gives a quiet, old pro's performance.

References

External links
 
 
 

1983 films
1983 comedy films
American comedy films
Columbia Pictures films
Films directed by Michael Ritchie
Films scored by Paul Chihara
Films set in New York (state)
Films shot in New York (state)
Films set in New York City
Films shot in New York City
Films set in Vermont
Films shot in Vermont
1980s English-language films
1980s American films